De Vecchi is a surname of Italian origin. Notable people with this surname include:

 Carlo de' Vecchi (1611-1673), Roman Catholic Titular Archbishop of Athenae and Bishop of Chiusi 
 Cesare Maria De Vecchi (1884-1959), Italian Fascist politician
 Giovanni de' Vecchi (bishop) (died 1509),  Roman Catholic Bishop of Termoli 
 Giovanni de' Vecchi (1536-1614), Italian painter of the Renaissance period
 Giovanni Antonio de' Vecchi (died 1672),  Roman Catholic prelate Bishop of Ischia 
 Arturo De Vecchi (1898-1988), Italian fencer
 Renzo De Vecchi (1894-1967), Italian football player and coach
 Robert P. DeVecchi (1930-2015), American academic

See also 
 Vecchi